Russell Warren may refer to:

 Russell Warren (architect) (1783–1860), American architect
 Russell Warren (cricketer) (born 1971), English cricketer

See also
 George Warren Russell (1854–1937), New Zealand politician